Serge Stresser (born 28 September 1953) is a French weightlifter. He competed in the men's bantamweight event at the 1976 Summer Olympics.

References

External links
 

1953 births
Living people
French male weightlifters
Olympic weightlifters of France
Weightlifters at the 1976 Summer Olympics
People from Haguenau
Sportspeople from Bas-Rhin
20th-century French people